

149001–149100 

|-bgcolor=#f2f2f2
| colspan=4 align=center | 
|}

149101–149200 

|-id=113
| 149113 Stewartbushman ||  || Stewart Bushman (born 1973), senior engineer at the Johns Hopkins University Applied Physics Laboratory. He served as the Propulsion Lead for the New Horizons mission to Pluto. || 
|-id=115
| 149115 Lauriecantillo ||  || Laurie L. Cantillo (born 1958) served as the NASA Public Affairs Lead for the New Horizons mission to Pluto. || 
|-id=157
| 149157 Stephencarr ||  || Stephen S. Carr (born 1959) is a program manager at the Johns Hopkins University Applied Physics Laboratory. He served as the director of public events for the flyby encounter for the New Horizons mission to Pluto. || 
|-id=160
| 149160 Geojih || 2002 GE || Geojih is an open, friendly and amateur group of geocaching fans in České Budějovice. They started geocaching activities in 2008 and have prepared many smart geocaches and amazing geocaching events up to now. A series of seven geocoins devoted to south Bohemian districts was also issued. || 
|-id=163
| 149163 Stevenconard ||  || Steven J. Conard (born 1959) is an optical engineer at the Johns Hopkins University Applied Physics Laboratory. He served as the Lead Instrument Engineer for the LORRI instrument for the New Horizons mission to Pluto. || 
|}

149201–149300 

|-id=243
| 149243 Dorothynorton ||  || Dorothy S. Norton (born 1945), scientific illustrator specializing in astronomy, geology and paleontology || 
|-id=244
| 149244 Kriegh ||  || James D. Kriegh (1928–2007), American civil engineering professor and meteorite hunter || 
|}

149301–149400 

|-bgcolor=#f2f2f2
| colspan=4 align=center | 
|}

149401–149500 

|-bgcolor=#f2f2f2
| colspan=4 align=center | 
|}

149501–149600 

|-id=528
| 149528 Simónrodríguez ||  || Simón Rodríguez (1769–1854) Venezuelan pedagogue and philosopher, teacher and mentor of Simón Bolivar, The Liberator || 
|-id=573
| 149573 Mamorudoi ||  || Mamoru Doi (born 1964), Japanese astronomer with the Sloan Digital Sky Survey || 
|}

149601–149700 

|-bgcolor=#f2f2f2
| colspan=4 align=center | 
|}

149701–149800 

|-id=728
| 149728 Klostermann ||  || Karel Klostermann (1848–1923),  Czech and Austrian novelist and writer of short stories || 
|}

149801–149900 

|-id=865
| 149865 Michelhernandez ||  || Michel Hernandez (born 1970), French amateur astronomer and expert in spectroscopy || 
|-id=884
| 149884 Radebeul ||  || The German town of Radebeul, Saxony, location of the Radebeul Observatory , where this minor planet was discovered || 
|}

149901–150000 

|-id=951
| 149951 Hildakowalski ||  || Hildegard Kowalski (born 1927), mother of one of the uncredited discoverers with the Catalina Sky Survey (presumably Richard Kowalski). || 
|-id=952
| 149952 Susanhamann ||  || Susan Hamann (born 1953) has spent her career advancing medical technology and working on bringing these lifesaving technologies to both emergency and everyday usage. || 
|-id=955
| 149955 Maron ||  || Marion Lorenz (born 1967), wife of the discoverer Joachim Lorenz and a committed teacher of sports and geography. Maron is her childhood nickname. || 
|-id=968
| 149968 Trondal ||  || Odd Trondal (born 1951), a member of the Norwegian Astronomical Society since 1968, was elected a Member of Honour in 2003 || 
|}

References 

149001-150000